Aldo Vicente Cornejo González (born 19 April 1955) is a Chilean politician who served as a member of the Chamber of Deputies, representing District 13 of the Valparaíso Region and as Mayor of Valparaíso.

References

1955 births
Living people
Presidents of the Chamber of Deputies of Chile
Pontifical Catholic University of Valparaíso alumni
Christian Democratic Party (Chile) politicians
Mayors of Valparaíso